Arman Serebrakian (born 9 April 1987) is an Armenian alpine skier. He was born in California, United States. He competed at the 2014 Winter Olympics in Sochi, in  giant slalom and slalom for Armenia, and was the flag bearer for Armenia during the Sochi Olympics Closing Ceremonies.

References

External links

1987 births
Living people
Alpine skiers at the 2014 Winter Olympics
Armenian male alpine skiers
Olympic alpine skiers of Armenia